Trachelipus schwangarti is a species of woodlouse in the genus Trachelipus belonging to the family Trachelipodidae that can be found in the Alps of Austria and northern Italy.

References

External links

Trachelipodidae
Woodlice of Europe
Crustaceans described in 1928